Ágnes Szávay was the defending champion, but lost in the second round to Anabel Medina Garrigues.

First-seeded Jelena Janković won in the final 6–3, 6–2, against Svetlana Kuznetsova.

Seeds
The top four seeds received a bye into the second round.

Draw

Finals

Top half

Bottom half

External links
Tournament Draws

China Open
2008 China Open (tennis)